John Castagna is an American geophysicist, known for the Mudrock line, currently the Margaret S. and Robert E. Sheriff Endowed Faculty Chair in Applied Seismology at Universidad Politécnica del Centro and formerly the Edward L. McCullough Chair.

References

University of Houston faculty
American geophysicists
Living people
Year of birth missing (living people)
Place of birth missing (living people)